The Men's Boxing Tournament at the 1975 Pan American Games was held in Mexico City, Mexico, from October 12 to October 26.

Medal winners

Medal table

External links
Amateur Boxing

1975 Pan American Games
Pan American Games
Boxing at the Pan American Games